Siah Kamareh Zali (also Romanized as Sīāh Kamareh Zālī and Sīāh Kamar-e Zālī) is a village in Zirtang Rural District, Kunani District, Kuhdasht County, Lorestan Province, Iran. At the 2006 census, its population was 207, in 38 families.

References 

Towns and villages in Kuhdasht County